Ağrı is an electoral district of the Grand National Assembly of Turkey. It elects four members of parliament (deputies) to represent the province of the same name for a four-year term by the D'Hondt method, a party-list proportional representation system.

Members 
Population reviews of each electoral district are conducted before each general election, which can lead to certain districts being granted a smaller or greater number of parliamentary seats. Ağrı elected four members in 1999. This rose to five in 2002 and 2007 before being reduced back down to four MPs in the 2011 general election.

General elections

2011

June 2015

November 2015

2018

Presidential elections

2014

References

Electoral districts of Turkey
Politics of Ağrı Province